Digar Union is a union of Ghatail Upazila, Tangail District, Bangladesh. It is situated 6 km south of Ghatail and 25 km north of Tangail, The District Headquarter.

Demographics

According to Population Census 2011 performed by Bangladesh Bureau of Statistics, The total population of Digar union is 37928. There are  households 9594 in total.

Education

The literacy rate of Digar Union is 43.2% (Male-46.8%, Female-40%).

See also
 Union Councils of Tangail District

References

Populated places in Dhaka Division
Populated places in Tangail District
Unions of Ghatail Upazila